Hill passes of the Lake District were originally used by people in one valley travelling to another nearby without having to go many miles around a steep ridge of intervening hills. Historically, in the  Lake District of northwest England, travel on foot or by pony was difficult because of the region's steep-sided valleys so tracks across the ridges were created taking the easiest route over passes – often, but not always, via a col. Since Roman times long-distance travel had tended to be along ridges. From the 19th century these passes and ridge routes were brought back into use when recreational hill walking become popular. Forty hill passes within the Lake District National Park are listed here, using criteria for selecting the major routes.

Background

Geology
About 500 million years ago in the late Cambrian and early Ordivician periods, the region was situated where the Iapetus ocean floor was being subducted under the Avalonia plate. Sedimentary material became metamorphosed to the Skiddaw slates found in the north and west. For a relatively short time of 5 million years Ordovician volcanoes ejected the Borrowdale volcanic rocks – firstly lavas (mostly andesite} and later pyroclastic rocks found in the more central part of the region. When the Baltica-Avalonia and Laurentia continents collided some 420 million years ago in the Caledonian orogeny there was folding of the slate and fracturing (faulting) of the more brittle volcanic rock. The whole region was then uplifted again by a batholith of granite mainly in the Carboniferous period although the granite remains largely below the surface. The high ground became gradually eroded and to the south the land subsided. In the south  of Windermere Supergroup sediment formed in the Silurian period with Coniston Limestone towards its base. Overall cover of limestone eroded away.

In the north, slaty rocks now form a smooth topography with sharp ridges although the hills can still be quite high –  in the case of Skiddaw. Centrally the pyroclastic tuff rocks  give a knobbly terrain such as that around Scafell Pike, England's highest mountain. To the south is a mostly less hilly area.

Glaciation

From about 2 million years ago glacial erosion then greatly modified the landscape.
Glaciers formed preferentially at existing streams which had developed at the many rock faults produced by crushing during the continental collision. The terrain was ground away leaving characteristically steep-sided glacial valleys which became ribbon lakes. On the Rossett Pass (see below) Rossett Gill is an example of a geological fault and the glacier that descended from it created the Mickleden and Great Langdale valleys below. Taken as a whole the region is characterised by  mountain ridges splaying out from a central core. The intervening valleys have been made by glaciers flowing outward along the lines of the previous streams draining the dome of the Lake District.

Human history
Historically the region was suitable for sheep hill farming and from medieval (or possibly Roman) times there was a substantial mining industry for rocks and minerals. The Romans had built a high-level military road north–south right through the region on its eastern edge at High Street and another road through the Hardknott and Wrynose passes for travel between forts at Ravenglass and Ambleside. Travelling between valleys was difficult on foot or by pony because of the steep passes across the mountainous ridges. With no roads suitable for wheeled traffic until the late 18th century, for long-distance transport of goods long trains of horses were used with ridge routes being preferred although Esk Hause and Stake Pass (see below) are thought to have been used in this way. However, for travel within the region, routes were best kept as low as possible consistent with avoiding excessive detours so summits and ridges were to be avoided as far as possible.

In the late 18th century the region started to become popular with travellers and the "Lake Poets" began seeing the lakes and mountains as beautiful rather than horrifying. In Victorian times, encouraged by the arrival of the Kendal and Windermere Railway, a tourist trade developed. In the mid twentieth century Alfred Wainwright inadvertently encouraged further recreational use with his series of books A Pictorial Guide to the Lakeland Fells which described detailed routes to the major summits. His considerable knowledge of the district allowed him to make use of the ancient tracks although his focus was not on the ridge passes themselves.

Hill passes

The passes are indicated in the following maps that are identical except for the annotation included. Both show the regions defined by Wainwright for his books. The first map shows the passes with their sequential numbers in the table. It also marks major lakes, valleys (dales) and a few important mountains. The second map shows the passes with their names (or a col on the route) and a few major towns. The colouring of the routes is merely to separate different adjacent ones.

Notes for table header

Selection criteria
The hill passes listed are routes within the Lake District National Park between two different valleys where a pathway is marked on the Ordnance Survey 1:50000 or 1:25000 map. Passes to be considered may be listed as "pass" or "hause" in the Ordnance Survey 1:50000 gazetteer provided also that a route crossing the ridge is marked on the map. Also included are routes described as passes in Wainwright's Guides and in other authoritative sources provided still that they go between different valleys. To be listed a pass does not necessarily have a name (though most do have names) nor does it need to cross a col (but nearly all do traverse cols). A few have been excluded when the gain in elevation seems rather small (less than about  – this particularly applies with paved roads.

Notes

References

Citations

Volumes in Wainwright's Pictorial Guide to the Lakeland Fells
The following individual volumes are part of a boxed set:

(same content as first 1968 edition)

Other works cited

 List of hill passes of the Lake District
Hill passes
Hill passes